Sing While You Dance is a 1946 American musical comedy film directed by D. Ross Lederman and starring Ellen Drew, Kirby Grant, and Andrew Tombes.

Plot

Cast
Ellen Drew as Susan Kent
Kirby Grant as Johnny Crane
Andrew Tombes as Gorman
Edwin Cooper as Davidson
Robert Kellard as Buzz Nelson (as Robert Stevens)
Ethel Griffies as Mrs. Abigail Smith
Amanda Lane as Gloria Mundy
Eddy Waller as Lem Aubrey
Paul E. Burns as Willow
Eddie Parks as Ramie Parks
Bert Roach as Jerome Smith

References

External links
 
 

1946 films
1946 musical comedy films
American musical comedy films
1940s English-language films
American black-and-white films
Films directed by D. Ross Lederman
Columbia Pictures films
1940s American films